Slack may refer to:

Places
 Slack, West Yorkshire, a village in Calderdale, England
 The Slack, a village in County Durham, England
 Slack (river), a river in Pas-de-Calais department, France
 Slacks Creek, Queensland, a suburb of Logan City, Queensland, Australia

Science and technology
 File slack, a kind of computer internal fragmentation
 Slack bus, an electrical power regulating system used to conduct load flow studies
 Slack (project management), the time that a task in a project network can be delayed without delaying subsequent tasks or the overall project
 Slack (software), a team communication tool that can be used for collaboration
 Slack variable, a mathematical concept
 Slackware, a Linux distribution
 Slack tub, used by a blacksmith to quench hot metal

People
 Andrew Slack (born 1955), Australian rugby union player
 Charlie Slack (1931–2020), American basketball player
 George Slack (1874–1950), American politician
 Shanon Slack (born 1984), American mixed martial artist

Other uses
 Resource slack, the level of availability of a resource to a business
 Slack, the central belief of the parody religion Church of the SubGenius
 Slack coal, fragments of coal and coal dust; for example used in the Birchills Power Station
 Slackness or slack, lyrics of a crude or bawdy nature in dancehall music
 Slacks or trousers
 Slack, the valley or trough between dunes
 Slack action, free movement due to loose couplings between railway cars

See also
 SLAC (disambiguation)
 Slacks (disambiguation)
 Slacker, a person who habitually avoids work or lacks work ethic